The 1916 Akron Burkhardts season was their ninth season in existence. The team played in the Ohio League and posted a 7–4–2 record. Their head coach was Ralph Waldsmith.

Schedule 
The table below was compiled using the information from The Pro Football Archives. The winning teams score is listed first. If a cell is greyed out and has "N/A", then that means there is an unknown figure for that game. Green-colored rows indicate a win; yellow-colored rows indicate a tie; and red-colored rows indicate a loss.

References 

1916
Akron Pros
Akron Pros